Andorra Airlines is a Spanish regional airline headquartered in Barcelona and based at Andorra–La Seu d'Urgell Airport, serving the micro state of Andorra.

History
The airline was founded in 2015 by businessman Jorge Soriano and two partners with plans to start operations by 2016 from Andorra–La Seu d'Urgell Airport which opened in 2010. Its aim is to connect Andorra with major Spanish and European destinations as there were no scheduled flight connections aside from Heliport operations. This was delayed by several years due to the bankruptcy of the investment fund in charge of the funding of the company.

In 2020, the company announced plans to inaugurate flights to Madrid and Palma de Mallorca using ATR turboprops. Andorra Airlines since has made the first official charter flight to Madrid on 20 April 2021.

Destinations 
As of October 2021, Andorra Airlines serves the following destinations:

Spain
La Seu d'Urgell - Andorra–La Seu d'Urgell Airport base
Madrid - Adolfo Suárez Madrid–Barajas Airport
Palma de Mallorca - Palma de Mallorca Airport

Fleet
As of October 2021, the Andorra Airlines fleet consists of the following aircraft:

References

Airlines of Spain
Airlines established in 2015
2015 establishments in Catalonia
Aviation in Andorra